The 1913 United States Senate election in Massachusetts was held during January 1913. Incumbent Republican Senator Winthrop Crane retired and was succeeded by Republican John Wingate Weeks. 

At the time, Massachusetts elected United States senators by a majority vote of the combined houses of the Massachusetts General Court.

Republican caucus

Candidates
 Eben Sumner Draper, former Governor of Massachusetts
 Curtis Guild Jr., U.S. Ambassador to Russia and former Governor of Massachusetts
 George P. Lawrence, U.S. Representative from North Adams
 Robert Luce, Lieutenant Governor of Massachusetts 
 Samuel Walker McCall, U.S. Representative from Winchester
 John Wingate Weeks, U.S. Representative and former Mayor of Newton

Results

After winning the caucus nomination on the thirty-first ballot, Weeks's support was made unanimous by acclamation on a motion by McCall supporter Claude L. Allen. The motion was seconded by Guild supporter John L. Sherburne.

General election

Notes

References

1913
Massachusetts
United States Senate